Darul Huda Islamic University is an educational institute of higher religious learning located at Chemmad in Malappuram district, Kerala. It is equivalent to an unaided and non-affiliated Indian madrasa. Established in 1986 it is a Sunni institution for the training of Islamic scholars in India. It offers both undergraduate and postgraduate programs.

From 2009, it has claimed the status of a private Islamic university; and from 2010 it has been affiliated to the League of Islamic Universities, Cairo, Egypt. However the UGC, India's only official body with the power to accredit universities, does not list it as a university.

References 

1986 establishments in Kerala
Islam in Kerala
Indian Union Muslim League
Islamic seminaries and theological colleges
Educational institutions established in 1986
Institutes of higher Islamic learning in Kerala
Islamic education